The Last Sherlock Holmes Story is a Sherlock Holmes pastiche novel by Michael Dibdin.

The novel is an account of Holmes's attempt to solve the Jack the Ripper murders. Holmes suspects the Ripper to be his nemesis, James Moriarty. There is a twist ending, revealing that Holmes himself had invented the character of Moriarty due to insanity, and was himself committing the crimes, a twist which some reviewers have found to be clever while others found disappointing. There is also an ambiguity to the revelation as, despairing, Holmes tries to explain to his companion Dr. John H. Watson that Moriarty has fooled Watson and framed Holmes.

See also
A Study in Terror
Dust and Shadow: An Account of the Ripper Killings by Dr. John H. Watson
Murder by Decree

References

1978 British novels
Sherlock Holmes novels
Sherlock Holmes pastiches
Novels set in London
Jonathan Cape books

1978 debut novels